Typical flora of Malta consist of the following plants. While small compared to other countries, the Maltese Islands contain flowers that grow on Malta, Gozo, Comino, Filfla, St Paul's Islands and Fungus Rock. Many of the species are endemic to Malta.

A

B

C

D

E

F

G

H

I

J

K

L

M

N

O

P

Q

R

S

T

U

V

W

X

Y

Z

References

 
Malta
Flora